Pocksha Pond is a lake/reservoir/pond within the towns of Lakeville and Middleboro, in southeastern Massachusetts. It shares its waters with Great Quittacas Pond and openly connected with Assawompset Pond. These lakes provides a source of drinking water to the city of New Bedford, the largest city in southeastern Massachusetts.

Wildlife
There have been bald eagle nests around the lake, and there have been beaver and otter sightings.
In June 2011, an American black bear was seen swimming across the lake.

References

Taunton River watershed
Lakes of Plymouth County, Massachusetts
Lakeville, Massachusetts
Middleborough, Massachusetts
Ponds of Massachusetts